The Mariupol Regional Intensive Care Hospital, formerly known as Mariupol City Hospital No. 2 is the largest hospital in Mariupol and in the Donetsk region (Ukraine), designed to provide inpatient and outpatient tertiary level care to residents of the region and secondary to the population of the Central region of Mariupol.

History 
The Mariupol Regional Intensive Care Hospital was founded as the Mariupol (Zhdanov) City Hospital No. 2 in April 1980.

On 22 December 2016, by order of the chairman of the Donetsk RegionalState Administration No. 1163 "On the adoption of the common property of territorial communities of villages, towns, cities under the control of the regional council, the integral property complex of the municipal institution" Mariupol City Hospital No. 2, the city hospital was transformed into a regional hospital with a name change.

In 2019, the hospital continued work on thermal modernization of the room and repairs of the operating unit and emergency department, as well as the extension of the MRI room.

Divisions 
(1 January 2022):
Emergency medical care (urgency, small operating rooms, emergency room)
Surgery No. 1 (general, abdominal, gastrointestinal bleeding)
Surgery No. 2 (purulent-septic, proctology)
Traumatology (orthopedics, joint prosthetics)
Neurosurgery (brain tumors, neurotrauma)
Urology (lithotripsy, andrology)
Gynecology
Otorhinolaryngology
Ophthalmology (eye microsurgery, lens surgery)
Therapy (pulmonology, nephrology, toxicology)
Neurology (cerebral strokes)
Cardiology
Gastroenterology
Anesthesiology (narcosis, postoperative beds)
Intensive care No. 1 (resuscitation)
Intensive care No. 2 (neurological resuscitation, thrombolysis)
Intensive care hyperbaric oxygenation (oxygen pressure chamber)
Physiotherapy (rehabilitation, massage)
Emergency surgical endoscopy (endoscopy, gastroscopy, colonoscopy, bronchoscopy)
Radiation diagnostics (X-ray, mammography, spiral computed tomography, magnetic resonance imaging)
Functional diagnostics (ultrasound, electroencephalography, Spirography)
Pathological anatomy (autopsy, biopsy, histological laboratory)
Clinical diagnostic laboratory (blood and urine tests, biochemistry, immunology, cytology, parasitology)
Outpatient department (polyclinic)
Regional telemedicine center (telehealth)
Support services (sterilization and disinfection units, catering unit, household services, archive)

References 

Hospital buildings completed in 1980
Hospitals in Ukraine
Buildings and structures in Mariupol
1980 establishments in Ukraine
Hospitals established in 1980